Giovanni Clericato (1633, at Padua – 1717) was an Italian canon lawyer.

Life

The patronage of a pious woman made it possible for him to study. As a priest, he came to be considered one of the ablest men of his time in matters of ecclesiastical jurisprudence. Cardinal Barbarigo, whose life he afterwards wrote, made him Vicar-General of the Diocese of Padua.

Works

He wrote many works on civil and canon law; his "Decisiones Sacramentales" was published in 1727, and in 1757 in three volumes, and was praised by Pope Benedict XIV (notific. 32, n. 6).

References

Attribution
 The entry cites:
Moréri, Gr. Dict. Hist. (Paris, 1759); 
Sberti, Memorie (Padua, 1790); 
Tiraboschi, Storia della Lett. Ital. (Milan, 1825).

1633 births
1717 deaths
17th-century Italian lawyers
Canon law jurists
18th-century Italian lawyers